Anthony  Philip Ward (born 9 August 1959) is a retired Australian cricketer and now works as an umpire.

Living people
1959 births
Australian cricket umpires